The Battle of Ibicuí River was a battle between the Luso-Brazilian forces under Brigadier Chagas dos Santos and the Federal League forces under the command of General Sotelo. The Luso-Brazilians were victorious and inflicted very high casualties on Sotelo's army.

References

Ibicuí
Ibicuí (1817)
Conflicts in 1817
1817 in Portugal
1817 in Brazil
1817 in Uruguay
Ibicuí (1817)